Arno Steffenhagen (born 24 September 1949) is a German retired professional footballer who played as a striker for clubs in Germany, South Africa, the Netherlands, the United States, and Canada, making nearly 400 career league appearances and scoring over 100 career league goals.

Career

Born in Berlin, Steffenhagen played in Germany, South Africa, the Netherlands, the United States, and Canada for Hertha BSC, Hellenic FC, Ajax, Hamburger SV, FC St. Pauli, Chicago Sting, Toronto Blizzard, Vancouver Whitecaps and Chicago Shoccers. He also won one cap for the Germany national team in 1971.

References

1949 births
Living people
Footballers from Berlin
German footballers
Association football forwards
Germany international footballers
Hertha BSC players
Hellenic F.C. players
AFC Ajax players
Hamburger SV players
FC St. Pauli players
Chicago Sting (NASL) players
Toronto Blizzard (1971–1984) players
Vancouver Whitecaps (1974–1984) players
Chicago Shoccers players
Bundesliga players
Eredivisie players
North American Soccer League (1968–1984) players
North American Soccer League (1968–1984) indoor players
National Professional Soccer League (1984–2001) players
German expatriate footballers
West German expatriate sportspeople in South Africa
Expatriate soccer players in South Africa
West German expatriate sportspeople in the Netherlands
Expatriate footballers in the Netherlands
West German expatriate sportspeople in the United States
Expatriate soccer players in the United States
West German expatriate sportspeople in Canada
Expatriate soccer players in Canada